Call of the Blood is a 1948 British-Italian drama film directed by John Clements and Ladislao Vajda and starring Clements, Kay Hammond and John Justin. In the Edwardian era a British family move to Sicily where the husband has an affair with a local woman. It was adapted from a 1906 novel of the same title by Robert Hichens. The film's sets were designed by art director Maurice Fowler. Elizabeth Haffenden worked as costume designer.

Cast
 John Clements as Julius Ikon
 Kay Hammond as Doctor Anne Lester
 John Justin as David Erskine
 Hilton Edwards as Doctor Robert Blake
 Robert Rietti as Gaspare
 Carlo Ninchi as Salvatore
 Lea Padovani as Maddelena
 Jelo Filippo as Sebastiono
 H.G. Stoker as Uncle Ben
 Keith Pyott as Doctor Sabatier
 Marcesa Faciacani as Lucretia

See also
The Call of the Blood (1920)

References

Bibliography
 Harper, Sue. Picturing the Past: The Rise and Fall of the British Costume Film. British Film Institute, 1994.

External links

1948 films
British historical drama films
1940s English-language films
Films based on British novels
1940s historical drama films
English-language Italian films
Italian historical drama films
Films directed by Ladislao Vajda
Films set in the 1900s
Films set in Sicily
British Lion Films films
British black-and-white films
Italian black-and-white films
British remakes of French films
Italian remakes of French films
Sound film remakes of silent films
1948 drama films
1940s British films
1940s Italian films